Alex Fernandez or Fernandes may refer to:

Alex Fernandez (actor) (born 1967), American actor
Alex Fernandez, member of a young detective club from Ghostwriter
Alex Fernandez (baseball) (born 1969), Cuban-American baseball pitcher
Alex Fernández (footballer) (born 1970), Colombian football defender
Alex Fernandes (born 1973), Brazilian-Mexican football striker
Álex Fernández (born 1992), Spanish football midfielder
 (born 1974), Spanish football midfielder
 (born 1974), Spanish football midfielder

See also
Alejandro Fernández (disambiguation)
Alex Fernandes (disambiguation)